A Pair of Silk Stockings is a 1918 American silent marital comedy film starring Constance Talmadge and Harrison Ford. It was directed by Walter Edwards and produced and distributed by Select Pictures. The film is based on a 1914 Broadway play of the same name, and not related to the Kate Chopin short story "A Pair of Silk Stockings".

Plot
As described in a film magazine, Molly Thornhill (Talmadge) and her husband Sam (Ford) disagree about automobiles and almost everything else. She buys a roadster while he prefers a touring car, and to retaliate he buys a cloak for an actress and leaves the bill where Molly finds it. She gets a divorce and later they are both guests at a house party. Sam hides in her room so that he can explain things to her, but is mistaken for a burglar by the young man of the house and is bound and gagged with silk stockings by the man and Molly. Sam escapes while they are attempting to explain their presence together, and because they cannot produce the burglar Molly is asked to leave. She refuses until a burglar has been found. Sam is discovered wearing the silk stockings and Molly's reputation is saved when Sam confesses his part in the midnight escapade.

Cast
Constance Talmadge as Mrs. Molly Thornhill
Harrison Ford as Sam Thornhill
Wanda Hawley as Pamela Bristowe
Vera Doria as Irene Maitland
Florence Carpenter as Maudie Plantaganet
Thomas Persse as Sir John Gower
Louis Willoughby as Captain Jack Bagnal
Helen Haskell as Angela
Larry Steers as McIntyre (billed as L. W. Steers)
Robert Gordon as Brook
Sylvia Ashton as Lady Gower

References

External links

The film is available from several DVD houses: Oldies.com, Loving the Classic, Grapevine Video

1918 films
American films based on plays
American silent feature films
1918 romantic comedy films
American romantic comedy films
American black-and-white films
Selznick Pictures films
Films directed by Walter Edwards
1910s American films
Silent romantic comedy films
Silent American comedy films
1910s English-language films